Psychogenic non-epileptic seizures (PNES) are events resembling an epileptic seizure, but without the characteristic electrical discharges associated with epilepsy. PNES fall under the category of disorders known as functional neurological disorders (FND), also known as conversion disorders.  A more recent term to describe these events is dissociative non-epileptic seizures. These are typically treated by psychologists or psychiatrists. PNES has previously been called pseudoseizures, psychogenic seizures, and hysterical seizures, but these terms have fallen out of favor.

Incidence
The number of people with PNES ranges from 2 to 33 per 100,000. PNES are most common in young adults, particularly women. The prevalence for PNES is estimated to make up 5–20% of outpatient epilepsy clinics; 75–80% of these diagnoses are given to female patients and 83% are to individuals between 15 and 35 years old.

Children
PNES are seen in children after the age of eight, and occur equally among boys and girls before puberty. Diagnostic and treatment principles are similar to those for adults, except that in children there is a broader differential diagnosis of seizures so that other possible diagnoses specific to children may be considered.

Signs and symptoms
Individuals with PNES present with episodes that resemble epileptic seizures, and most have received a diagnosis of epilepsy and treatment for it. PNES episodes are nearly indistinguishable from epileptic seizures. The main differences between a PNES episode and an epileptic seizure is the duration of episodes. Epileptic seizures typically last between 30 and 120 seconds depending on the type, while PNES episodes typically last for two to five minutes.

Causes and risk factors
The cause of PNES has not yet been established. One hypothesis is that they are a learned physical reaction or habit the body develops, similar to a reflex. The individual does not have control of the learned reaction, but this can be retrained to allow the patient to control the physical movements again. The production of seizure-like symptoms is not under voluntary control, meaning that the person is not faking; symptoms which are feigned or faked voluntarily would fall under the categories of factitious disorder or malingering.

Risk factors for PNES include having a history of head injury, and having a diagnosis of epilepsy. Approximately 10–30% of people diagnosed with PNES also have an epilepsy diagnosis. People diagnosed with PNES commonly report physical, sexual, or emotional trauma, but the reported incidence of these events may not differ between PNES and epilepsy.

Diagnosis
According to the Diagnostic and Statistical Manual of Mental Disorders (version 5) the criteria for receiving a diagnosis of PNES are:

 One or more symptoms of altered voluntary motor or sensory function.
 Clinical findings provide evidence of incompatibility between the symptom and recognized neurological or medical conditions.
 The symptom or deficit is not better explained by another medical or mental disorder.
 The symptom or deficit causes clinically significant distress or impairment in social, occupational, or other important areas of functioning or warrants medical evaluation.

Additionally, the specific symptom type must be reported "with attacks or seizures".

Some individuals with PNES have carried an erroneous diagnosis of epilepsy. On average, it takes seven years to receive a proper diagnosis. The differential diagnosis of PNES firstly involves ruling out epilepsy as the cause of the seizure episodes, along with other organic causes of non-epileptic seizures, including syncope, migraine, vertigo, anoxia, hypoglycemia, and stroke. However, 5–20% of people with PNES also have epilepsy. Frontal lobe seizures can be mistaken for PNES, though these tend to have shorter duration, stereotyped patterns of movements, and occurrence during sleep. Next, an exclusion of factitious disorder (a subconscious somatic symptom disorder, where seizures are caused by psychological reasons) and malingering (simulating seizures intentionally for conscious personal gain – such as monetary compensation or avoidance of criminal punishment) is conducted. Finally other psychiatric conditions that may superficially resemble seizures are eliminated, including panic disorder, schizophrenia, and depersonalisation disorder.

The most definitive test to distinguish epilepsy from PNES is long term video-EEG monitoring, with the aim of capturing one or two episodes on both video recording and EEG simultaneously (some clinicians may use suggestion to attempt to trigger an episode). Additional clinical criteria are usually considered in addition to video-EEG monitoring when diagnosing PNES. By recording the event in question on video and EEG simultaneously, a clear diagnosis can usually be obtained.

Laboratory testing can detect rising blood levels of serum prolactin if samples are taken in the right time window after most tonic-clonic or complex partial epileptic seizures. However, due to false positives and variability in results, this test is relied upon less frequently.

Distinguishing features
Some features are more or less likely to suggest PNES but they are not conclusive and should be considered in the broader clinical picture. Features that are common in PNES but rarer in epilepsy include: biting the tip of the tongue, seizures lasting more than two minutes (easiest factor to distinguish), seizures having a gradual onset, a fluctuating course of disease severity, the eyes being closed during a seizure, and side to side head movements. Features that are uncommon in PNES include automatisms (automatic complex movements during the seizure), severe tongue biting, biting the inside of the mouth, and incontinence.

If a person with suspected PNES has an episode during a clinical examination, there are a number of signs that can be elicited to help support or refute the diagnosis of PNES. Compared to people with epilepsy, people with PNES will tend to resist having their eyes forced open (if they are closed during the seizure), will stop their hands from hitting their own face if the hand is dropped over the head, and will fixate their eyes in a way suggesting an absence of neurological interference.

Treatment
Patient understanding of the new diagnosis is crucial for their treatment, which requires their active participation. There are a number of recommended steps to explain to people their diagnosis in a sensitive and open manner. A negative diagnosis experience may cause frustration and could cause a person to reject any further attempts at treatment. Eight points recommended to explain the diagnosis to the person and their caregivers are:

 Reasons for concluding they do not have epilepsy
 What they do have (describe FND)
 Emphasize they are not suspected of "putting on" the attacks, and the symptoms are not "all in their head"
 There may be no triggering "stresses"
 Maintaining factors
 May improve after correct diagnosis
 Caution that anticonvulsant drug withdrawal should be done in conjunction with their physician
 Describe treatment to help regain control of symptoms

Psychotherapy is the most frequently used treatment, which might include cognitive behavioral therapy or therapy to retrain the physical symptoms and allow the individual to regain control of the attacks (ReACT). There is also some evidence supporting selective serotonin reuptake inhibitor antidepressants.

Cognitive behavioral therapy

Cognitive behavioral therapy (CBT) treatments for PNES typically target fear avoidance and work to reattribute patients' symptoms to psychosocial issues.

Retraining and Control Therapy (ReACT)

ReACT, while new and understudied, has shown extremely promising outcomes for reduction of PNES episodes in pediatric patients. This therapy focuses on the idea that PNES are caused by a learned physical reaction or habit the body develops, similar to a reflex. ReACT aims to retrain the learned reaction (PNES episodes) by targeting symptom catastrophizing and restoring sense of control over symptoms.

Prognosis
Though there is limited evidence, outcomes appear to be relatively poor with a review of outcome studies finding that two-thirds of people with PNES continue to experience episodes and more than half are dependent on the Social Security program at three-year follow-up. This outcome data was obtained in a referral-based academic epilepsy center and loss to follow-up was considerable; the authors point out ways in which this may have biased their outcome data. Outcome was shown to be better in people with higher IQ, social status, greater educational attainments, younger age of onset and diagnosis, attacks with less dramatic features, and fewer additional somatoform complaints.

For individuals who pursue treatment for PNES, CBT has shown varying rates of success but it has been established as one of the most promising treatments to date. ReACT has shown reduction in symptoms by 100% seven days after treatment and 82% of individuals who completed the therapy remained symptom free for 60 days. A follow-up has not been done to see if the therapy retained its reduction of symptoms beyond the 60 days. The largest trial of CBT for PNES though found no significant reduction in monthly seizures compared to the control arm at 12 months, however there were significant improvements on a number of secondary outcomes, such as psychosocial functioning, and self-rated and clinician-rated global change.

History
Hystero-epilepsy is a historical term that refers to a condition described by 19th-century French neurologist Jean-Martin Charcot where people with neuroses "acquired" symptoms resembling seizures as a result of being treated on the same ward as people who genuinely had epilepsy.

The etiology of FND was historically explained in the context of psychoanalytic theory as a physical manifestation of psychological distress and repressed trauma. There is very little supporting evidence for this theory, as there is little research.

The DSM-IV lists conversion disorders instead of the current FND. Additionally, in revision, the DSM-5 was updated to add emphasis to the positive physical signs inconsistent with recognized diseases. The requirement of a history of psychological stressors and that the symptom is not fake was removed as well.

Society and culture
PNES rates and presenting symptoms are somewhat dependent on the culture and society. In some cultures, they, like epilepsy, are thought of as a curse or a demonic possession. In cultures with a solid establishment of evidence-based medicine, they are considered a subtype of a larger category of psychiatric disease.

Terminology
The use of older terms including pseudoseizures and hysterical seizures are discouraged. In the English language, the word "seizure" usually refers to epileptic events, so some prefer to use more general terms like "events", "attacks", or "episodes", as the term "seizures" may cause confusion with epilepsy.

PNES may also be referred to as "non-epileptic attack disorder" "functional seizures", "dissociative convulsions" or "dissociative non-epileptic seizures". These terms are more neutral as to cause, and given that a psychological cause cannot be identified in many cases, they may be more appropriate. Within DSM 5, patients presenting with PNES may meet the criteria for functional neurological disorder and in some cases, somatic symptom disorder, whilst in ICD 10 it may meet the criteria for a conversion disorder.

References

External links 

Somatic symptom disorders
Disorders causing seizures
Seizure types